Beynelmilel may refer to:

 Beynəlmiləl, Azerbaijan
 Beynelmilel (film), Turkish film, see Cinema of Turkey